Mark Merklein (born June 28, 1972) is a Bahamas-born former college and professional tennis player. He played for the Bahamas Davis Cup team from 1999–2004.

Merklein was born in Freeport, Bahamas.  He grew up in Coral Springs, Florida, and attended St. Thomas Aquinas High School in nearby Fort Lauderdale.  Playing for the St. Thomas Raiders high school tennis team, he won six Class 3A high school titles – two at No. 2 singles, one at No. 1 singles, and three at No. 1 doubles.

Merklein accepted an athletic scholarship to attend the University of Florida in Gainesville, Florida, where he played for the Florida Gators men's tennis team in National Collegiate Athletic Association (NCAA) and Southeastern Conference (SEC) competition from 1991 to 1994.  As a Gator, he won the NCAA national championship doubles title with partner David Blair in 1993.  The following year, Merklein won the NCAA national championship singles title in 1994 in dominating fashion, losing only one set.  Merklein was a four-time All-American, a three-time All-SEC selection, and the SEC Player of the Year in 1994.  He was inducted into the University of Florida Athletic Hall of Fame as a "Gator Great" in 2005.

Merklein turned professional in 1994, and won four doubles titles during his career. He won matches at all four Majors. On July 7, 1997, he reached his highest singles ranking of world No. 160, and reached his highest doubles ranking on January 12, 2004, when he became world No. 37.

On May 24, 2013, Merklein was hired as the University of Florida men's tennis assistant coach.

Merklein currently resides in Gainesville, Florida.

Grand Slam tournament performance timelines

Singles

Doubles

See also 

List of Florida Gators tennis players
List of University of Florida Olympians
List of University of Florida Athletic Hall of Fame members

References

External links 

 
 
 

1972 births
Living people
Bahamian expatriates in the United States
Bahamian male tennis players
Bahamian people of German descent
Florida Gators men's tennis players
Sportspeople from Gainesville, Florida
People from Freeport, Bahamas
Tennis people from Florida
Tennis players at the 2000 Summer Olympics
Tennis players at the 2004 Summer Olympics
Olympic tennis players of the Bahamas
St. Thomas Aquinas High School (Florida) alumni